Daynes is a surname. Notable people with the surname include:

Colin Daynes (born 1974), Canadian sport wrestler
Élisabeth Daynès (born 1960), French sculptor
Joseph J. Daynes (1851–1920), English organist
Kathryn M. Daynes (born 1946), American historian

See also
Dayne